Ähijärve is a settlement in Antsla Parish, Võru County in southeastern Estonia. As of 2011, its population was 30.

References

External links 
Satellite map at Maplandia.com

Villages in Võru County